Ravi Shankar Sharma (3 March 1926 – 7 March 2012), often referred to mononymously as Ravi, was an Indian music director, who had composed music for several Hindi and Malayalam films. After a successful career in Hindi cinema, he took a break from the 1970s to 1984, and made a successful comeback in the Malayalam music scene under the stage name Bombay Ravi.

Biography
Ravi was born in Delhi on 3 March 1926. He had no formal training in classical music; instead he learned music by listening to his father sing bhajans. He taught himself to play harmonium and other classical instruments and worked as an electrician to support his family. In 1950 he decided to shift to Bombay and become a professional singer. At first Ravi was homeless, living on the streets and sleeping on Malad railway station at night.

In 1952, Ravi was discovered by Hemant Kumar who hired him to sing backing vocals in Vande Mataram from the film Anand Math. Ravi gave several hit songs and received Filmfare nominations for these films: Chaudhvin Ka Chand (1960), Do Badan (1966), Hamraaz (1967), Ankhen (1968), and Nikaah (1982).  He won Filmfare awards for Gharana (1961) and Khandan (1965). His other successful films include Waqt, Neel Kamal and Gumraah. His songs Aaj mere yaar ki shaadi hai, Babul ki duyaen leti ja, Doli chadh ke dulhan sasural chali and Mere Yaar Bana hai Dulha became very popular in wedding celebrations.

Ravi was one of the music directors who shaped the career of Asha Bhosle with songs like Tora man darpan, Aage bhi jane na tu  and Sun le Pukar Aai. He was also instrumental in making Mahendra Kapoor a popular singer in Bollywood.  After a successful career in Hindi films during the 1950s and 1960s, he took a long break after 1970 till 1982. In 1982, he gave music for the Hindi film Nikaah, and one of the film's songs Dil ke armaan aansooyon main beh gaye sung by Salma Agha won her the Filmfare Best Female Playback Award.

In the 1980s, he made a comeback as a music director in Malayalam (and some Hindi) films as Bombay Ravi. During 1986, the Malayalam director Hariharan convinced him to make this comeback. The first movie was Panchagni. The songs Saagarangale and Aa raatri maanju poyi (sung by Yesudas and Chitra) were hits. That same year, Hariharan's Nakhakshathangal also came out and Chithra won her second National Award for the song Manjalprasaadavum from the same film. All the songs from the Malayalam movie Vaisali released in 1989 were super hits and Chithra won her third National Award for the song Indupushpam Choodi Nilkum from the same film. Ravi was a constant in Hariharan films and their combination is regarded as one of the best ever in Malayalam. Ravi has composed for many films produced by South Indian banners: Ghoonghat, Gharana Grihasti, Aurat, Samaj ko badal dalo (Gemini), Meherban, Do Kaliyan (AVM), Bharosa, Khandan (Vasu Films).

Ravi's most notable work is with Chopra brothers. From Gumrah he continuously worked with Sahir Ludhianvi, the lyricist. Waqt, Humraaz, Admi aur Insan, Dhund, Nikah and Dehleez were among his all-time hit films  He was very comfortable with Sahir and gave beautiful tunes to his poetry also for Aaj aur kal, Kajal, Ankhein, Neelkamal, Do kaliyan, Amanat, Ganga tera pani amrit. Ek mahal ho sapno ka.

Personal life
Ravi's wife Kanti, whom he married in 1946, died in 1986. He had two daughters Veena and Chhaya and a  son Ajay. His estranged son Ajay is married to Varsha Usgaonkar who is a Marathi and Hindi film actress.  Ravi died on 7 March 2012 in Mumbai at the age of 86.

Awards
National Film Award for Best Music Direction (1995), Parinayam, Sukrutham
Kerala State Film Award for Best Music Director (1986, 1992), Nakhakshathangal, Sargam
Kerala State Film Award for Best Background Music (1993), Ghazal
 Filmfare Award for Best Music Director – Malayalam for Parinayam - 1994
Filmfare Award for Best Music Director, (1962, 1966), Gharana, Khandan
 Sanskriti Kalashree Award (2006–07), Chennai, Tamil Nadu

Filmography

Telugu
 Sarigamalu (1994)

Punjabi
 Sajjan Thug (1981)
 Sassi Punnu (1983)

Hindi
Ravi was responsible for a number of hit tunes of Hindi film songs. His music went on to inspire later day music directors too. The opening bars of "Chanda Mama Door Ke" inspired the tune for the hit song "Ek Do Teen" in the 1988 film "Tezaab".

 Vachan (1955)
 Albeli (1955)
 Inspector (1956) as music assistant 
 Ek Saal (1957)
 Narsi Bhagat (1957)
 Dilli Ka Thug (1958)
 Dulhan (1958)
 Ghar Sansar (1958)
 Mehndi (1958)
 Chirag Kahan Roshni Kahan (1959)
 Nai Raahen (1959)
 Apna Ghar (1960)
 Chaudhvin Ka Chand (1960)
 Ghunghat (1960)
 Tu Nahin Aur Sahi (1960)
 Modern Girl (1961)
 Gharana (1961)
 Nazrana (1961)
 Pyaar Ka Saagar (1961)
 Wanted (1961)
 Salaam Memsaheb (1961)
 China Town (1962)
 Baaje Ghungroo (1962)
 Rakhi (1962)
 Tower House (1962)
 Girls' Hostel (1962)
 Isi Ka Naam Duniya Hai (1962)
 Bombay Ka Chor (1962)
 Aaj Aur Kal (1963)
 Gehra Daag (1963)
 Gumrah (1963)
 Pyar Ka Bandhan (1963)
 Nartaki (1963)
 Ustadon Ke Ustaad (1963)
 Yeh Rastey Hain Pyar Ke (1963)
 Bharosa (1963)
 Mulzim (1963)
 Pyaar Kiya To Darna Kya (1963)
 Grahasti (1963)
 Kaun Apna Kaun Paraya (1963)
 Door Ki Awaz (1964)
 Shehnai (1964)
 Kaajal (1965)
 Khandan (1965)
 Waqt (1965)
 Bahu Beti (1965)
 Do Badan (1966)
 Dus Lakh (1966)
 Phool Aur Patthar (1966)
 Sagaai (1966)
 Yeh Zindagi Kitni Haseen Hai (1966)
 Aurat (1967)
 Hamraaz (1967)
 Mehrban (1967)
 Nai Roshni (1967)
 Aankhen (1968)
 Do Kaliyan (1968)
 Gauri (1968)
 Man Ka Meet (1968)
 Neel Kamal (1968)
 Paisa Ya Pyaar (1969)
 Aadmi Aur Insaan (1969)
 Anmol Moti (1969)
 Badi Didi (1969)
 Doli (1969)
 Ek Phool Do Mali (1969)
 Samaj Ko Badal Dalo (1970)
 Chingari (1971)
 Babul Ki Galiyaan (1972)
 Dharkan (1972)
 Naag Panchami (1972)
 Dhund (1973)
 Mehmaan (1973)
 Ghatana (1974)
 Ek Mahal Ho Sapno Ka (1975)
 Vandana (1975)
 Amaanat (1977)
 Aadmi Sadak Ka (1977)
 Premika (1980)
 Nikaah (1982)
 Aaj Ki Awaz (1984)
 Mujhe Shaktee Do (1984)
 Hum Do Hamaare Do (1984)
 Tawaif (1985)
 Khamosh Nigahen (1986)
 Dahleez (1986)
 Awam (1987)
 Ghar Ka Sukh (1987)
 Meraa Suhaag (1987)
 Ek Alag Mausam (2003)

Malayalam (as Bombay Ravi and Ravi Bombay)
 Panchagni (1986)
 Nakhakshathangal (1986)
 Vaishali  (1988)
 Oru Vadakkan Veeragatha (1989)
 Vidhyarambham (1990)
 Sargam (1992)
 Ghazal (1993)
 Padheyam (1993)
 Parinayam (1994)
 Sukrutham (1994)
 Kalivaakku (Film Not Released)(1996)
 Five Star Hospital  (1997)
 Manassil Oru Manjuthulli (2000)
 Mayookham (2005)

Non-movie audio album (Malayalam)
 Aavani Kanavukal (1997)

References

External links
 
 An interview with The Hindu
 Bombay Ravi at MSI (in Malayalam)

Malayalam film score composers
Filmfare Awards winners
Kerala State Film Award winners
2012 deaths
1926 births
Filmfare Awards South winners
Hindi film score composers
Best Music Direction National Film Award winners
20th-century Indian musicians
Telugu film score composers
Recipients of the Padma Shri in arts